Bruno Tiago Costa Araújo (born March 28, 1989 in São Luís, Maranhão) is a Brazilian footballer who plays for Ascenso MX club Cancún as an attacking midfielder.

Career
What was revealed by Bruno Maranhão Sampaio Corrêa Futebol Clube, then moved to the U.S., both teams in the state of Maranhao.

In 2009 came to Madureira Esporte Clube. After being featured in the Carioca championship in 2010, agreed with Botafogo to compete in the Brazilian Championship the same year.

Career statistics
(Correct )

Honours
Cafetaleros de Tapachula
 Ascenso MX: Clausura 2018

References

External links
 ogol.com
 cg-fudbal.com
 

1989 births
Living people
Brazilian footballers
Brazilian expatriate footballers
Sampaio Corrêa Futebol Clube players
Madureira Esporte Clube players
Botafogo de Futebol e Regatas players
Joinville Esporte Clube players
Boavista Sport Club players
Clube Atlético Linense players
Cafetaleros de Chiapas footballers
Club Celaya footballers
Ascenso MX players
Liga MX players
Campeonato Brasileiro Série A players
Campeonato Brasileiro Série B players
Campeonato Brasileiro Série C players
Association football midfielders
Brazilian expatriate sportspeople in Mexico
Expatriate footballers in Mexico
People from São Luís, Maranhão
Sportspeople from Maranhão